The 2023 Nepal Tri-Nation Series was the 19th round of the 2019–2023 ICC Cricket World Cup League 2 cricket tournament took place in Nepal in February 2023. It was a tri-nation series between the men's national cricket teams of Namibia, Nepal and the Scotland, with the matches being played as One Day International (ODI) fixtures. The ICC Cricket World Cup League 2 formed part of the qualification pathway to the 2023 Cricket World Cup.

Scotland's 10-wicket win against Namibia in the 2nd ODI of the series confirmed them as the winners of the 2019–23 League 2 tournament and they were presented with the trophy as the end of this series.

Squads

Fixtures

1st ODI

2nd ODI

3rd ODI

4th ODI

5th ODI

6th ODI

References

External links
 Series home at ESPNcricinfo

2023 in Nepalese cricket
2023 in Namibian cricket
2023 in Scottish cricket
International cricket competitions in 2022–23
Nepal
February 2023 sports events in Asia